"Kill Me Now" is an episode of Gilmore Girls.

Kill Me Now may also refer to:

Kill Me Now, a 2012 film featuring Beck Bennett, Kyle Mooney, and Michael Swaim
Kill Me Now, a 2014 play by Brad Fraser
"Kill Me Now!", a track from Metal Gear Solid 2: Sons of Liberty Original Soundtrack (2001)
"Kill Me Now", a song by Rio Grand from their 2006 album Painted Pony
"Kill Me Now", a song by Ektomorf from their 2010 album Redemption
Kill Me Now, a podcast by Judy Gold